Mississippi College (MC) is a private Baptist university in Clinton, Mississippi. Founded in 1826, MC is the second-oldest Baptist-affiliated college or university in the United States and the oldest college or university in Mississippi.

History

Founding

On January 24, 1826, the college received its first charter, signed by Mississippi Gov. David Holmes. In 1827, the name was changed from Hampstead Academy to Mississippi Academy at the request of the board of trustees. On December 18, 1830, having become a college, the name was changed to Mississippi College. It offered degrees in arts, sciences, and languages.

As a private institution in 1831, Mississippi College became the first coeducational college in the United States to award a degree to a female student. That year it granted degrees to two women, Alice Robinson and Catherine Hall.

In the beginning Mississippi College was not church-related. For a number of years, it was affiliated with the Methodist and Presbyterian churches. Since 1850, Mississippi College has been affiliated with the Mississippi Baptist Convention, and the board of trustees oversees the institution.

Civil War and reconstruction
Classes were not held during the Civil War, and the buildings deteriorated. Many students joined with faculty, a school trustee and townspeople to form the Mississippi College Rifles during the war years or signed up with other units.

In the half-century after the war the college enrollment and campus slowly recovered, but its neglected buildings were not significantly damaged by the war. College President Walter Hillman helped refurbish the buildings by securing Northern financing prior to being offered the college presidency. The endowment fund was renewed and the physical structures were renovated.

From 1911 through 1932 the college prospered, seeing the completion of the Provine Science Building as well as Lowrey Hall, Alumni Hall and Farr-Hall Hospital, among others. The college endowment grew to $500,000 and in 1922, the Southern Association of Colleges and Schools approved accreditation for the college. Enrollment reached 400 students.

World War II and later 20th century
In 1942, Mississippi College acquired Hillman College. A new Nelson Hall administration building was erected in 1948, and new residence halls were built.

In 1943, MC was among 131 colleges and universities nationwide taking part in the V-12 Navy College Training Program, which offered students a path to a Navy commission. During the V-12 period, the Navy had exclusive use of Chrestman, Alumni Hall, and the cafeteria. The last surge of construction during this era was a building for a growing fine arts program and a library. The war years saw enrollment in the 550-600 range. With veterans returning from World War II, enrollment increased. bout 1,000 students were enrolled by 1950, with 1,581 students by fall 1956.

Mississippi College was one of the last private colleges in the country to drop its segregation policy, and did not do so until the 1969–70 school year.

From 1957 through 1968, the college built the B.C. Rogers Student Center, Hederman Science Building, Self Hall, and a pair of residence halls. Provine Chapel was restored. The School of Nursing began in 1969. With the coming of the School of Law in 1975, when MC purchased the former Jackson School of Law, the college took another step toward a university structure. In 1975, the division of business became the School of Business. In 1977, the division of education became the School of Education. In 1982, the 12 remaining departments were grouped into the College of Arts and Sciences.

In May 1992, MC absorbed Clarke College after the smaller school was forced to close due to declining enrollments. Throughout the 1990s, the college renovated and expanded; work was carried out on the library, electronic media center, Cockroft Hall (for the School of Nursing), A.E. Wood Coliseum, the Law School building in downtown Jackson, the New Men's Residence Hall, the New Women's Residence Hall, Jennings Hall, and Latimer House (a Victorian house later used for alumni receptions).

21st century
From 2002 to 2015,the college's enrollment grew from 3,227 to 5,152, an increase of 60%. The number includes a record of 618 freshmen.

The number of international students rose from nine to a record 505 students from more than two dozen nations in fall 2015.

The college added a physician assistant program in 2011, becoming the first institution in Mississippi to offer such a degree. MC now offers doctorates in educational leadership and professional counseling.

MC emphasizes public service. In 2011–2012, students, faculty, and staff performed more than 45,000 hours of community service at 153 different agencies, while the campus hosted Centrifuge and Super Summer camps.

Mississippi College was granted an exception to Title IX in 2015, which allows it to legally discriminate against LGBT students for religious reasons.

Presidents
Since its beginning, Mississippi College has had 23 presidents/principals, including three interim presidents. The first three presidents were known as "principals", before changing the official title to "president".

 F. G. Hopkins  (1826 to 1828)
 Daniel Comfort (1828 to 1834)
 N. Shepherd (1835 to 1836)
 E. N. Elliott (1836 to 1837)
 Daniel Comfort (1837 to 1841)
 Alexander Campbell (Jan. to April 1842)
 Alexander Campbell (1842 to 1844)
 Interim Robert McLain (1844 to 1845)
 Daniel Comfort (1845 to 1846)
 Simeon Colton (1846 to 1848)
 Consider Parish (1848 to 1850)
 Isaac Newton Urner (1850 to 1867)
 Walter Hillman (1867 to 1873)
 Warren Sheldon Webb (1873 to 1890)
 James M. Moore (1890 to 1891)
 Robert Abram Venable (1891 to 1895)
 John William Provine (1895 to 1897)
 John William Provine (1897 to 1898)
 William Tyndale Lowrey (1898 to 1911)
 John William Provine (1911 to 1932)
 Dotson McGinnis Nelson (1932 to 1957)
 Richard Aubrey McLemore (1957 to 1968)
 Lewis Nobles (1968 to 1993)
 Interim Rory Lee (1993 to 1994)
 Howell W. Todd (1994 to 2001)
 Interim Lloyd Roberts (2001 to 2002)
 Lee G. Royce (2002 to 2018)
 Blake Thompson (2018 to present)

Campus
Mississippi College's main campus in Clinton sits on more than 80 acres. The Mississippi College School of Law is located in downtown Jackson. Classes are also offered on Saturday mornings.

Notable buildings at Mississippi College include its historic Provine Chapel that opened in 1860 and is the oldest building on the Clinton campus. During the Civil War, U.S. General Ulysses S. Grant used it as a hospital for his wounded troops and reports say it was also used as a stable for his horses. Opened in 1926, Alumni Hall houses a gymnasium used for intramural basketball games, and a large pool used for water aerobics by students, faculty and staff. Built in 1948, Nelson Hall serves as the university's administration building and contains Swor Auditorium, the venue for concerts and other musical performances. Aven Hall houses the recitals at the Jean Pittman Williams Recital Hall and some theatre performances in the Aven Little Theater. The Samuel Marshall Gore Galleries hosts fine art exhibitions.

The A.E. Wood Coliseum is used for MC Choctaws basketball games as well as serving as the site for university graduations. Self Hall houses the MC School of Business and Lowrey Hall, the former MC library, serves as the home of the School of Education. The modern Leland Speed Library houses books, audiotapes, computers, study rooms, meeting rooms and its Learning Resources Center that includes studios for the Department of Communication to videotape events on campus. The 20,000-square-foot Royce Medical Science Center, named in honor of President Emeritus Lee G. Royce, opened in January 2013 and contains a cadaver lab, research facilities and new classrooms. The 106,000-square-foot Baptist Healthplex serves the health and fitness needs of faculty, staff, students, alumni and Jackson area residents. The Healthplex also contains medical offices serving the community and is home of MC's Physician Assistant Program. The School of Law building in downtown Jackson serves more than 500 law students each year. Cockroft Hall houses the nursing and kinesiology departments.  The B.C. Rogers Student Center includes the campus cafeteria, meeting rooms for large functions, such as Anderson Hall, and office space for organizations including the Baptist Student Union. The 8,500-seat Robinson-Hale Stadium is the home field for MC Choctaws football games and track meets on the Clinton campus.

University Place residence halls opened in August 2015 to accommodate 189 students. Cost of the eight modern brick units was $16 million. The facilities represent the first new residence hall construction in nearly 20 years on the Clinton campus.

The Rhoda Royce Prayer Garden is named in the honor of the wife of retired President Lee Royce. It contains fountains and rocks with scriptures from the Bible. Rhoda Royce served for more than a decade as a volunteer tutor to children in the Clinton public schools. The MC Dyslexia Center was expanded in January 2019 to include additional rooms to evaluate children with the learning disability, and other offices.

Academics
The School of Business is AACSB-accredited and located in Self Hall. The school offers 6 undergraduate business majors and the MBA. With an enrollment of 850 students, business is the single largest undergraduate major on campus.

The School of Education includes the Department of Kinesiology, the Department of Psychology and Counseling, the Department of Teacher Education and Leadership, and the Dyslexia Center.  The School of Christian Studies and the Arts includes the Department of Art, the Department of Christian Studies and Philosophy, the Department of Communication, and the Department of Music.

The School of Humanities and Social Sciences spans the Department of English, the Department of Modern Languages, the Department of History and Political Science, and the Department of Sociology and Social Work; The School of Science and Mathematics includes the Department of Biological Science, the Department of Chemistry and Biochemistry, the Department of Computer Science and Physics, the Department of Mathematics, and the Department of Physician Assistant Studies. The School of Nursing is based at Cockcroft Hall on the Clinton campus. The MC School of Law serves more than 400 students on East Griffith Street in downtown Jackson. Overall, Mississippi College consists of more than 80 academic programs.

The Physician Assistant Program enrolls 94 students. The doctorate in professional counseling, the first of its type in the United States, enrolls 120 students.

The MC student/faculty ratio is 14:1. The average ACT score for incoming freshmen is 24.

The institution is ranked among the "Absolute Worst Campuses for LGBTQ Youth" in the US by Campus Pride.

Notable programs
Launched in May 2011, the Department of Physician Assistant Studies serves 90 graduate students. One-of-a-kind in Mississippi, the MC program works with the University of Mississippi Medical Center in Jackson, federal clinics and other medical facilities. MC's newest doctorates include educational leadership and professional counseling. MC's School of Law in Jackson serves students. The university's master's in medical sciences program serves more than 200 graduate students.

Since June 1984, the Mississippi College Administration of Justice Program has had over 250 Bachelor of Science graduates as well as 70 graduates in the Master of Social Science Program. The program overall competes with Mississippi's public universities such as the University of Mississippi's Criminal Justice program, the University of Southern Mississippi's Forensics program, and Mississippi State's Criminology program.

Athletics

Mississippi College competes in NCAA Division II as a member of the Gulf South Conference. The college sponsors teams in football, basketball (men's and women's), baseball, softball, tennis (men's & women's), golf (men's & women's), soccer (men's & women's), volleyball, track and field (men's indoor & outdoor & women's indoor & outdoor), cross country running (men's & women's), equestrian (women's), and table tennis (men's & women's).

The MC men's baseball team won the 2018 Gulf South Conference championship.

In Fall 2018, the MC women's soccer team finished the season ranked No. 14 in the nation. The team competed in the Sweet 16 of the NCAA Division II post-season tournament.

The MC table tennis team finished the 2017–18 season ranked No. 3 in the nation at the championship games in Round Rock, Texas in April 2018. More than 150 colleges in the US and Canada field table tennis teams.

MC's archery team won two first-place medals at the National 3D Championships in Foley, Alabama in October 25–28. 2018. The MC men's compound team won first place. So did the MC bowhunter women's squad. USA Archery and the Archery Shooters Association sanctioned the national competition in Alabama.

In 2015, the women's soccer team advanced to the championship game of the National Christian College Athletic Association, losing in penalty kicks after playing to a draw with Houghton College.

The MC women's softball team was the 2017 Gulf South Conference champion.

From 2012 through 2014, MC's table tennis team ended the season ranked No. 2 among the more than 150 colleges playing the Olympic sport. In 2015, the MC table tennis team captured the national championship. The team won the title at the National Collegiate Table Tennis Association games in Wisconsin.

The university's equestrian team commenced in 2008.

MC became the first college in the state to field an archery team in Fall 2014. The university's bass fishing and sporting clays squads takes part in regional and national competitions.

An archery team member won a gold medal as the best collegiate male bow hunter in the USA. The honor came at the Spring 2017 U.S. Collegiate Archery Championship in South Dakota.

Mississippi College athletic teams began the transition to NCAA Division II and rejoined the Gulf South Conference based in Birmingham, Alabama in Fall 2014.

Notable alumni

 Jake Allen, former Green Bay Packers, Cleveland Browns, Calgary Stampeders, Georgia Force football star
 Lance Barksdale, Major League Baseball umpire
 Phil Bryant, Governor of Mississippi
 Alston Callahan, ophthalmologist
 Michael Catt, Christian movie producer and pastor
 Ted DiBiase, Jr., retired professional wrestler, most known with the WWE
 James R. Dow, distinguished folklore scholar, Professor Emeritus at Iowa State University
 Bernard Ebbers, co-founder and former CEO of WorldCom
 Larry Evans, former Denver Broncos and Green Bay Packers football star
 Major Everett, former Philadelphia Eagles, Cleveland Browns, Atlanta Falcons football star
 W.C. Friley, president of Hardin–Simmons University from 1892 to 1894 and Louisiana College from 1909 to 1910
 J. Andrew Gipson, Mississippi Commissioner of Agriculture; Former Mississippi House of Representatives member and attorney
 Edgar Godbold, president of Howard Payne University from 1923 to 1929 and Louisiana College from 1942 to 1951
 Mary Lou Godbold, Mississippi state senator
 Alice Haining, actress
 Barry Hannah, author
 Gregg Harper, U.S. Congressman from Mississippi
 Fred McAfee, former New Orleans Saints football star, later the team's director of player personnel
 Leon C. Megginson, business professor noted for his clarifying statements about Darwinism 
 Larry Myricks, U.S. Olympic track and field medalist
 Horace Newcomb, Lambdin Kay Chair at the Grady College of Journalism and Mass Communication
 Joseph Turner Patterson (D) - Former Attorney General of Mississippi
 Dayn Perry, Baseball writer, author and poet
 Anita Raj,  developmental psychologist, academic, and global public health researcher
 Anita Renfroe, Christian humorist
 Harold Ritchie, member of the Louisiana House of Representatives, 2004–2016, term-limited
 Carroll Waller, First Lady of Mississippi (1972–1976) and historic preservationist
 Michael Williams, former NFL player
 Lee Yancey, Mississippi senator

See also
 The Cedars, historic home in Clinton owned by various university faculty for over a decade.

References

Further reading
 Charles E. Martin, Mississippi College with Pride: A History of Mississippi College, 1826–2004. Clinton, Mississippi: Mississippi College, 2007.
 Richard Aubrey McLemore and Nannie Pitts McLemore, The History of Mississippi College. Jackson, Mississippi: Hederman Brothers, 1979.
 A.V. Rowe, History of Mississippi College : an address delivered before the Alumni Society at Clinton, Hinds County, June 28, 1881. Jackson, Mississippi: Charles Winkley, 1881.
 William Herrington Weathersby, "A History of Mississippi College", Publications of the Mississippi Historical Society, Centenary Series. vol. 5, pp. 184–220.

External links

 
Educational institutions established in 1826
Universities and colleges in the Jackson metropolitan area, Mississippi
Universities and colleges accredited by the Southern Association of Colleges and Schools
Universities and colleges affiliated with the Southern Baptist Convention
Private universities and colleges in Mississippi
Education in Hinds County, Mississippi
Buildings and structures in Hinds County, Mississippi
Education in Rankin County, Mississippi
Education in Madison County, Mississippi
1826 establishments in Mississippi
Council for Christian Colleges and Universities